Annapoorna is a 1964 Indian Kannada language film directed by Aaroor Pattabhi and produced by actress Pandari Bai. Besides Pandari Bai herself in the titular role, the film starred K. S. Ashwath, Mynavathi and Balakrishna in other main roles. Popular star Kalyan Kumar made a brief appearance in the first half of the film while Rajkumar makes an entry after one and a half hour into the movie. He appeared in the role of a lawyer for the first time on-screen. Chi. Udayashankar became full-fledged lyricist for the first time by writing all the songs of this movie. The movie is a remake of Pandari Bai's 1959 Tamil film Aval Yaar  which had not performed well at the box-office.

Cast 
 K. S. Ashwath as Shivashankar
 Pandari Bai as Annapoorna
 Mynavathi as Ashadevi
 Balakrishna as Kailas
 Ganapathi Bhat
 B. Ramadevi
 K. M. Rathnakar
 Rajkumar as Krishna
 Kalyan Kumar as Mohan Ram (cameo)
 R. Nagendra Rao in a guest appearance
 Ravikala as (Baby Ravikala) as Krishna
 Music Director Vijaya Bhaskar (credited as Bhaskar) as Shashikanth singing "Kannadave Taynudiyu" and '"Hrudayaveene Nudiye Taane" in the voice of P. B. Srinivas

Soundtrack 
The music of the film was composed by Rajan–Nagendra, with lyrics for the soundtrack penned by Chi. Udaya Shankar.

Track list

References 

1964 films
1960s Kannada-language films
Indian black-and-white films
Films scored by Rajan–Nagendra